Daniel Pytel (born 23 November 1987 in Barlinek, Poland) is a Polish speedway rider who was a member of Poland U-21 team. He is current Team U-21 World Champion and Individual U-21 Polish Vice-Champion.

He is a student in University of Zielona Góra.

Career details

World Championships 
 Team U-21 World Championship
 2008 -  Holsted - World Champion (5 points)

European Championships 
 Individual European Championship
 2009 - 11th place in Qualifying Round 2

Domestic competitions 
 Individual Polish Championship
 2008 - 8th place in Quarter-Final 4
 2009 - 10th place in Quarter-Final 4
 Individual U-21 Polish Championship
 2007 -  Rzeszów - Bronze medal
 2008 -  Rybnik - Silver medal (13+2 points)
 Team Polish Championship
 2004 - dit not started
 2005 - CMA 0.500
 2006 - CMA 1.981
 2007 - CMA 1.140
 Polish Silver Helmet (U-21)
 2008 -  Rzeszów - 9th place (8 points)

See also 
 Poland national speedway team
 Speedway in Poland

References

External links 
 (Polish) Official webside
 (Polish) Speedway-Milion-Team.pl - Rider profil
 (Polish) Skorpiony.org - Rider profil

1987 births
Living people
People from Barlinek
Polish speedway riders
Team Speedway Junior World Champions
Sportspeople from West Pomeranian Voivodeship